This is a list of flags that are used exclusively in Brittany. Other flags used in Brittany, as well as the rest of France can be found at list of French flags.

Regional flags

Departmental flags

City and town flags

Traditional regions

Traditional districts

Landforms

Landmarks

Political flags

Religious flags

Historical flags

See also
List of French flags

Notes
 Registered at the French Society of Vexillology.

References

Brittany